Huiatahi Barrett (c.1874 – 27 October 1952) was a New Zealand tribal leader. Of Māori descent, he identified with the Ngāti Maniapoto iwi. He was born in Waiharakeke, Waikato, New Zealand on c.1874.

References

1870s births
1952 deaths
Ngāti Maniapoto people
New Zealand Māori farmers